Konstantin Neumann (January 28, 1897 – November 5, 1937) was born in what is now Jelgava, Latvia. 

He led the 35th Rifle Division during the Soviet occupation of Mongolia.
He was a recipient of the Order of Lenin (1936) and the Order of the Red Banner. 

During the Great Purge, he was arrested on July 21, 1937 and later executed.

References

1897 births
1937 deaths
People from Jelgava
Russian military personnel of World War I
People of the Russian Civil War
Neumann
Great Purge victims from Latvia
People executed by the Soviet Union
Recipients of the Order of Lenin
Recipients of the Order of the Red Banner